Philippe Pasqua (born 15 June 1965) is a French contemporary artist, known for his paintings, sculptures and drawings. Self-taught and (solitary), he is best known for his paintings of Vanitas and considered one of the major artists of his generation.

Biography 
Born in Grasse on 15 June 1965, Philippe Pasqua moved to Paris in 1975. When he was about 18, he started painting and moved to New-York where he lived for about two years. In 1985 he was noticed for his paintings of fetishes and voodoo inspired figures and makes his gallery debut in 1990. According to Art critic José Alvare, Philippe Pasqua has a playful approach to his work, despite being extremely productive and living an ascetic life : he sleeps very little and does not drink or smoke. In only three years, between 1995 and 1997, he created about a thousand pieces.
In 2006 the collector and art dealer Jose Mugrabi bought about a hundred of his works, and asked for some sort of exclusivity on Pasqua's artistic production. Art historian Pierre Restany has also shown interest in the work of Philippe Pasqua and has written about it. In 2011, Pasqua's signature came second in Artprice rankings of French contemporary artists.

Painting 
Philippe Pasqua says he likes painting better than other medium. His works depict transsexuality, Down syndrome, and blindness. Julián Zugazagoitiai, director of El Museo del Barrio in New York City, accounts for Pasqua's choices this way: "Through painting, Philippe Pasqua confers dignity to subjects that are, sadly, dealt with by the media without any aesthetic or ethical consideration. As opposed to sensational media coverage that make of us all indulgent onlookers of the immediate present, Philippe Pasqua’s work opens us to the transcendence of painting and questions the moral values of our time." The many layers of paint applied on the canvas to show the brutality of matter are in total opposition with the vulnerable and fragile human subjects of Pasqua's series. Pasqua uses mostly red, brown and grey hues, in an attempt to render the color of flesh. His series of drawings depict the same subjects as his paintings but with voluntarily blurred outlines.
Philippe Pasqua makes palimpsests, works on paper that mix serigraphy, print, paint, pastel and inking techniques. He comes back relentlessly to his own works, adding new colors or drawing over them. In the late 1990s, he worked together with Jean-Luc Moulène, painting over his photographs, including his snapshots of Notre-Dame de Paris.

Sculpture 
Philippe Pasqua started sculpting in 1990 with the series "Vanitas", consisting of several works of up to three meters high. He also photographed the works, and considered the photographs to be works in themselves. When sculpting, he uses bronze, onyx, solid silver, Carrara marble, human skulls covered in pigments, gold, or silver leaves, and tattooed leather. Through the 2000s, and even more so during the 2010s, sculpture gained more focus in his work. His sculpture works are extremely diverse and include bronze olive trees, clown-headed monkeys staged to evoke Leonardo da Vinci’s Last Supper, Tyrannosaurus-Rex, and a Ferrarri covered in tattooed animal hide and hung vertically on a wall. In 2017, he was invited by the Oceanographic Museum of Monaco to raise awareness about ocean protection.  On this occasion, he exhibited monumental sculptures of sea animals. The previous artist invited by the museum was Damien Hirst, with whom Pasqua had worked in the past. The following year he exhibited in the park and castle of the Chamarande domaine, near Paris.

Shows

Solo shows 
 1990 : Espace Confluence, Paris
 1991 : Galerie Wo Mang et Partners, Paris
 1995 :
 Château de Grouchy, Osny, France
 Espace Dautzenberg, Brussels
 The International Center, Detroit (Michigan)
 1996 : Galerie Boulakia, Paris
 1998 : Yvonamor Palix Art Space, Mexico
 1999 : Lucien Durand Gallery, Paris
 2001 : Trauma, Galerie Hengevoss-Durkop-Jensen, Hamburg
 2002 :
 Les miroirs de l’âme (Portraits 1989 – 2001), Palais Bénédictine, Fécamp
 Bloc portrait, Galerie Hengevoss-Durkop, Hamburg
 2003 :
 Galerie Hengevoss Dûrkop-Jensen, Hamburg
 Lucille, RX Gallery, Paris
 2004 : Métamorphoses, RX Gallery, Paris
 2005 : Centre culturel de la ville de Metz
 2006 :
 Patrick Painter Gallery, Santa Monica (California)
 Spike Gallery, New York
 2007 : Philippe Pasqua – Pulsion, RX Gallery and Enrico Navarra gallery, Paris
 2009 :
 Philippe Pasqua, Stiftung Ahlers Pro Arte, Hanover, curated by par Peter Lipke
 Crâne, ArtCurial, Paris
 Crâne, Isola di San Servolo, Venice
 2010 :
 Philippe Pasqua, Peintures et dessins, Moscow Museum of Modern Art, curated by par Marc Ivalevitch and David Rosenberg en partenariat avec la RX Gallery
 Mea culpa, The Storage, Paris
 2011 :
 Silence, The Storage, Paris
 Philippe Pasqua, Absolute Art Gallery, Knokke, Belgium
 2012 :
 Philippe Pasqua, Peintures et Dessins, Art Révolution, Taipei, Taïwan
 Philippe Pasqua, Peintures récentes, RX Gallery, Paris
 Philippe Pasqua, Peinture, Fondation Fernet-Branca, Saint-Louis
  Work in Progress, Peinture et Sculpture, The Storage, Paris
 Philippe Pasqua, Gallery Hyundai, Seoul
 Philippe Pasqua in London, Opera Gallery, London
 2013 :
 Philippe Pasqua, Peinture, Dessin et Sculpture, Art Stage Singapour, Singapore
 2017 :
 Borderline, Oceanographic museum of Monaco, Monaco
 Memento Mori, Zemack Contemporary Art, Tel Aviv
 2018 :
 Allegoria, Domaine de Chamarande, Essonne
2021
Face to face, Espace Art Absolument,Paris

Group shows 
 1990: Maison des Arts, Beausset, France
 1992: Salon des Grands et Jeunes d’Aujourd'hui, Paris
 1994 :
 Association Aides, Espace Cardin, Paris
 Chaussures d’Artistes, Fundacio Joan Miró, Barcelona
 1997 : 3 Visions de l’Art contemporain français, Martini Gallery, Hong Kong
 1998 :
 80 artistes autour du Mondial, Enrico Navarra Gallery, Paris (avec Jeff Koons, Rotella, César, Matta, Clemente, Nam June Paik...)
 Hygiène, Yvonar Palix Art Space, Mexico (avec Orlan, Aziz + Cucher, Sandy Skoglund, Steve Miler)
 Hygiène, La Source Foundation, La Guéroulde, France
 Collection Ahrenberg : 50 ans d’histoire de l’art, curated by par Erick Öge, Museum of Fine Arts, Mons, Belgium
 1999 :
 Fétiches, Fétichismes, Passage du Retz, Paris, curated by Jean Michel Ribettes
 Naço & Friends, Espace Via, Paris
 2000 :
 Narcisse blessé, Passage du Retz, Paris, curated by par Jean Michel Ribettes
 Collages d’hier et d’aujourd'hui, Lucien Durand Gallery- Le Gaillard, Paris
 2001 : Face Off, Aeroplastics Damasquine Gallery, Brussels
 2002 : Inauguration, RX Gallery, Paris
 2004 :
 Beyond Paradise, RX Gallery, Paris
 Artistes contemporain des galeries du 8e arrondissement, Ville de Paris
 2005 :
 Quintessence, RX Gallery, Paris
 Au-delà du corps, Contemporary Art Biennale, Aixe-sur-Vienne, France
 A3, Place St Sulpice, Paris, curated by Sophie Actis
 2006 : Soutine and Modern Art, Cheim and Read Gallery, New-York.
 2010 :
 New Era, RX Gallery, Paris
 C'est la vie ! Vanités de Caravage à Damien Hirst, curated by Patrizia Nitti, art director of Musée Maillol, Claudio Strinati, executive director
 2011 :
 Drawing Now, RX Gallery, Paris
 ART Paris, RX Gallery, Paris
 ART Miami, RX Gallery, Paris
 2012 :
 Plaisir, RX Gallery, Paris
 Popening, Laurent Strouk Gallery, Paris
 Damien Hirst vs Philippe Pasqua, Laurent Strouk Gallery, Paris
 2015 :
 Collection Luciano Benetton, CAC Màlaga, Spain
 2017 :
 Recomposition, RX Gallery, Paris
 2018 :
 Action ! La Nouvelle École française : première époque, Bastille Design Center, Paris
2019 :
Stage Beasts, Fondation Villa Datris, L'Isle-sur-la-Sorgue

Publications

See also 

 Damien Hirst
 Vanitas

References

External links 

 
 Galerie RX - Paris & Ivry

Living people
21st-century French painters
21st-century French male artists
French contemporary artists
French sculptors
1965 births